Conductivity may refer to:

Electrical conductivity, a measure of a material's ability to conduct an electric current
Conductivity (electrolytic), the electrical conductivity of an electrolyte in solution
Ionic conductivity (solid state), electrical conductivity due to ions moving position in a crystal lattice
Hydraulic conductivity, a property of a porous material's ability to transmit water
Thermal conductivity, an intensive property of a material that indicates its ability to conduct heat

See also
Conductance (disambiguation)
Superconductivity